Davis Granados (Deivis Granados) (born 16 May 1981 in Colombia) is a Colombian football defender.

Career
He currently plays for Atlético Chiriquí in the ANAPROF.

Granados played for San Francisco FC in the group stages of the CONCACAF Champions League 2008–09.

References

External links 
Profile at GolGolGol
Posso Futbol profile

1981 births
Living people
Colombian footballers
Barranquilla F.C. footballers
San Francisco F.C. players
Atlético Chiriquí players
Colombian expatriate footballers
Colombian expatriate sportspeople in Panama
Expatriate footballers in Panama
Association football defenders